Miguel García Fernández (born 6 February 1973, in Luanco) is a Spanish sprint canoer who competed in the early to mid-1990s. He won a bronze medal in the K-1 200 m at the 1994 ICF Canoe Sprint World Championships in Mexico City.

Garcia also competed in two Summer Olympics, earning his best finish of fifth in the K-4 1000 m event at Atlanta in 1996.

References

External links
 
 
 

1973 births
Living people
Spanish male canoeists
Olympic canoeists of Spain
Canoeists at the 1992 Summer Olympics
Canoeists at the 1996 Summer Olympics
ICF Canoe Sprint World Championships medalists in kayak
20th-century Spanish people